Michael Lohscheller is a business man, who worked as management control system for Jungheinrich, CFO at Mitsubishi Motors, CFO at Volkswagen Group, CEO at Opel and then VinFast of Vingroup from Vietnam.

Early life and education 
Lohscheller graduated from Osnabrück University of Applied Sciences (Germany) and the University of Barcelona (Spain) in 1992. During his working years, Michael Lohscheller completed a Master’s Program in European Marketing Management and obtained his M.A. at Brunel University London in 1996.

Working 
Lohscheller began his career in 1992, working as a controller at Jungheinrich AG., then at DaimlerChrysler.

In 2001, he transferred to Mitsubishi Motors and rose to be CFO.  In 2004, he started as director of group marketing and sales control at Volkswagen AG. After four years, he assumed the position of CFO of Volkswagen Group USA.

In 2012 Lohscheller moved to Adam Opel AG, where he became a board member. In June 2017, he was promoted to chief executive officer of the car manufacturer, now transformed into Opel Automobile GmbH, succeeding Karl-Thomas Neumann. By July 2021, he was the head of Renault Germany, Austria and Switzerland. His successor at Opel was Uwe Hochgeschurtz.

In 2019, he received the Award Eurostar 2019 Magazine Automobile Automotive News Europe, Awards MANBEST 2019 was selected by the Jury of the Organization AUTOBEST and League Manager of the Year 2019 Magazine Autozeitung.

In July 2021, Vietnam's Vingroup announced that Lohscheller would become the chief executive officer of the Vinfast car brand and be responsible for marketing the brand globally. In late December he stepped down from his position.

In February 2022, Lohscheller was appointed President of Nikola Motor.

Personal life

See also 
 Robert Stempel Managing Director Adam Opel AG 1980-1982
 Louis R. Hughes
 Carl-Peter Forster chairman and managing director of Adam Opel AG since April 2001 - 2009
 Karl-Friedrich Stracke Chief Executive Officer of Adam Opel AG.

References

External links 
 
 

1968 births
Living people
Management occupations
German businesspeople
Vingroup
People from Bocholt, Germany
Osnabrück University of Applied Sciences alumni
University of Barcelona alumni
Alumni of Brunel University London
Stellantis
Adtranz
Mitsubishi Motors people
Volkswagen Group people
Opel people